Ambatolaona is a rural municipality in Madagascar. It belongs to the district of Manjakandriana, which is a part of Analamanga Region. The population of the commune was estimated to be approximately 5,000 in 2001 commune census.

Only primary schooling is available. The majority 94.5% of the population of the commune are farmers.  The most important crops are rice and beans, while other important agricultural products are maize, sweet potatoes and potatoes. Industry and services provide employment for 0.5% and 5% of the population, respectively.

Roads
This municipality is crossed by the National Road 2.

Lakes
A part of Lake Mantasoa belongs to this municipality.

Tourism
The forest station of Saha Maintsoanala.

Epidemcs
In November 2022 the pest had been reported from the village of Antanjona that belongs to this municipality.

References

Populated places in Analamanga